The 1962 San Diego State Aztecs football team represented San Diego State College during the 1962 NCAA College Division football season.

San Diego State competed in the California Collegiate Athletic Association (CCAA). The team was led by head coach Don Coryell, in his second year, and played home games at Aztec Bowl. They finished the season as CCAA champions, with eight wins and two losses (8–2, 6–0 CCAA). For the year, the offense averaged almost 30 points a game, totaling 294 points. The defense gave up an average of 13 points a game, totaling 135 in 10 games.

Schedule

Team players in the NFL/AFL
The following San Diego State players were selected in the 1963 NFL Draft.

The following San Diego State players were selected in the 1963 AFL Draft.

Team awards

Notes

References

San Diego State
San Diego State Aztecs football seasons
California Collegiate Athletic Association football champion seasons
San Diego State Aztecs football